Parineeta is a 2019 Indian Bengali romantic drama film directed and produced by Raj Chakraborty under the banner Raj Chakraborty Productions. The film illustrates love break up and revenge urban love story – with Subhashree Ganguly, Ritwick Chakraborty, Gaurav Chakrabarty and Falaque Rashid Roy. Adrit Roy plays a pivotal role in the film. The music of the film  is composed by Arko Pravo Mukherjee. The film was theatrically released on 6 September 2019. And it was launched on ZEE5 for online streaming. The film earned ₹2.3 crore worldwide and Subhashree received  Best Actress at West Bengal Film Journalists' Association Awards & Filmfare Best Actress award. The soundtrack Tomake sung by Shreya Ghoshal was one of the most popular Bengali song of 2019 which also got best song award. Tomake lyrics was written by Arko.

Plot
Mehul (Subhashree Ganguly) is infatuated with her tuition teacher, Babaida (Ritwick Chakraborty). Mehul believes Babaida reciprocates her feelings. Babaida tells her that he has something to say to her and she assumes he is going to propose. On Holi, while she is waiting on the terrace (with abeer and vermillion), Babaida introduces Sayantika, his new girlfriend. He puts the abeer and vermillion on Mehul and tells her now she has to shoulder the responsibility of not just him but his better half too. Mehul is heartbroken and starts avoiding him. One day, a distressed Babaida hands her a letter, which she takes reluctantly. Three months later, she is told that Babaida committed suicide. After seeing his body, she breaks down.

Four years later, Mehul is working in a government company with a low-paid salary with which she sustains two households - her own and Babaida's, where only his bedridden mother lives. Her colleague Ananda encourages her to go to an interview at a big corporate company called Unicorn. Mehul does so and is hired. On her first day, she meets her boss, a young man, Ranadeb (Gaurav Chakrabarty). Mehul gives herself a makeover, dressing more provocatively and boldly, and catches Ranadeb's attention. Babaida's mother dies in the meantime. One day, Ranadeb invites her for dinner and tries to sleep with her. Suddenly, his phone rings and Mehul sees his wife is calling him: Sayantika, Babaida's girlfriend. When she provokes him, Ranadeb asks her who she is and attempts to rape her but she escapes.

In the next scene, she runs to a police station in bare feet, messed makeup, and her dress torn, indicating that she was raped. It is then that the mystery behind Babaida's suicide unfolds. From the letter he gave her, Mehul learned that Babaida and Sayantika were college friends and had entered Unicorn as interns. Sayantika started to change after Ranadeb began showing interest in her. One day Babaida entered Ranadeb's cabin to find Sayantika and Ranadeb making out. Enraged, he attacks Ranadeb. Sayantika and Ranadeb conspired against Babaida. Sayantika ran to the police station the same way Mehul had and falsely accused Babaida of raping her, for which Babaida had to face legal charges. The rape charge was too much to take as well as his career ending, and he committed suicide. Sayantika and Ranadeb married after Babaida's death. Before dying, he figured only Mehul would believe him as she loves him.

In present day, Mehul falsely accuses Ranadeb of rape the same way and he is arrested. He and Sayantika are also charged with fraudulence. Thus it becomes clear that Mehul had entered the company with a motive to avenge Babaida's death. At the end, she speaks to Babaida's portrait and tells him that she considered herself his wife as he had put vermillion on her head that day on Holi, four years ago. Being his wife, it was her duty to give him justice.

Cast 
 Ritwick Chakraborty as Babaida/ Sayan Roy 
 Subhashree Ganguly as Mehul Bose
 Gaurav Chakrabarty as Ranadev Sen
 Falaque Rashid Roy as Sayantika Sen 
 Biswajit Chakraborty as Mehul's father
 Laboni Sarkar as Babai's mother
 Tulika Basu as Mehul's mother
 Samiul Alam as Mehul's brother
 Adrija Addy Roy as Tusu - Mehul's friend
 Tithi Das as Motu
 Soumi Paul as Riya - Mehul's office colleague
 Adrit Roy as Ananda (Guest Appearance)

Marketing and release 
The official trailer of the film was unveiled by Raj Chakraborty Entertainment Pvt. Ltd. on 4 July 2019.

It was theatrically released on 6 September 2019.

The film was released to widespread acclaim. The movie was highly appreciated by critics as well as masses & received positive to mixed reviews.

Awards and nominations 
At the WBFJA Awards the film won the award Best Actress for Ganguly. At the "Films & Frames Digital Awards", Parineeta won a leading six awards out of a leading 7 nominations: Best Film, Best Director, Best Actress for Ganguly, Best Playback Singer Female for Shreya Ghoshal, Best Music Director & Best song Tomake.

Soundtrack

The music of the soundtrack composed by Arko on his own lyrics.

References

External links
 

2019 films
Films set in Kolkata
Indian romantic drama films
Bengali-language Indian films
2010s Bengali-language films
2019 romantic drama films
Films directed by Raj Chakraborty